Opata may refer to:

 Opata people, an ethnic group of Mexico
 Opata language, their language
 Aleš Opata, Czeck military officer
 Zoltán Opata, Hungarian football player and manager

See also